In Trump We Trust: E Pluribus Awesome! is a 2016 book by American conservative commentator and author Ann Coulter in support of Donald Trump and his 2016 campaign for the presidency of the United States. The e-book was a New York Times bestseller in September 2016.

By the end of Trump's term in office, Coulter's endorsement of Trump had turned upside down. While refusing to acknowledge that she was misguided in boosting Trump's candidacy in 2016, Coulter in 2021 said, "Trump betrayed his own supporters at every turn ... I hate him. He's a betrayer."

References

Further reading

External links
 After Words interview with Coulter on In Trump We Trust, August 26, 2016

2016 non-fiction books
Anti-immigration politics in the United States
Books by Ann Coulter
Donald Trump 2016 presidential campaign
Books about the 2016 United States presidential election
Books about Donald Trump
Books about the Trump administration
English-language books
Sentinel (publisher) books